Missouri's 6th congressional district takes in a large swath of land in northern Missouri, stretching across nearly the entire width of the state from Kansas to Illinois. Its largest voting population is centered in the northern portion of the Kansas City metropolitan area and the town of St. Joseph. The district includes nearly all of Kansas City north of the Missouri River (including Kansas City International Airport).

The district takes in all or parts of the following counties: Adair, Andrew, Atchison, Buchanan, Caldwell, Carroll, Chariton, Clark, Clay, Clinton, Daviess, De Kalb, Gentry, Grundy, Harrison, Holt, Jackson, Knox, Lewis, Linn, Livingston, Macon, Marion, Mercer, Monroe, Nodaway, Pike, Platte, Putnam, Ralls, Schuyler, Scotland, Shelby, Sullivan, Worth.

Notable representatives from the district include governors John Smith Phelps and Austin A. King as well as Kansas City Mayor Robert T. Van Horn. In 1976, Jerry Litton was killed on election night as he flew to a victory party after winning the Democratic nomination for United States Senate. The visitors center at Smithville Lake is named in Litton's memory. Democrat Pat Danner, a former aide to Jerry Litton, won the seat in 1992 becoming the first woman to be elected in the district defeating a 16-year Republican incumbent.

George W. Bush beat John Kerry in this district 57%–42% in 2004. The district is represented by Republican Sam Graves, who has held the seat since 2001. Graves easily held on to his seat what was expected to be a tough 2008 election, defeating former Kansas City mayor Kay Waldo Barnes by 23 percentage points.

Historically, the 6th was not safe for either party. However, in recent years, it has trended Republican, mirroring the increasingly conservative bent of the more rural areas of Missouri that historically voted for Yellow Dog Democrats.

Redistricting following 2010 census
After Missouri lost a congressional seat following the 2010 census (in part because of losses in population in several rural northern Missouri counties), the 6th was expanded to include most of Missouri north of the Missouri River, stretching from border to border from Kansas to Illinois. The biggest geographic addition was in northeast Missouri (including Kirksville, Missouri and Hannibal, Missouri), which used to be the northern half of the old 9th district.

The 6th lost Cooper and Howard counties to the 4th district, and Gladstone in southwestern Clay County to the 5th district. Meanwhile, the 6th was extended into Jackson County for the first time, taking in the northeastern portion between the Missouri River and Interstate 70, as well as a small sliver southwest of Independence.

List of members representing the district

Election results from presidential races

Election results

1996

1998

2000

2002

2004

2006

2008

2010

2012

2014

2016

2018

2020

Historical district boundaries

See also

Missouri's congressional districts
List of United States congressional districts

References

 Congressional Biographical Directory of the United States 1774–present
 https://web.archive.org/web/20131013222920/http://2010.census.gov/2010census/popmap/

06
Constituencies established in 1853
1853 establishments in Missouri
Constituencies disestablished in 1933
1933 disestablishments in Missouri
Constituencies established in 1935
1935 establishments in Missouri